Palladium disulfide is a chemical compound of palladium and sulfur with the chemical formula PdS2.

Preparation
Palladium disulfide is formed when palladium(II) sulfide is heated with an excess of sulfur.

PdS + S → PdS2

However, some starting material may remain even after heating for many months. An alternative route involves heating palladium(II) chloride and excess sulfur to 450 °C in a sealed tube, then washing the crude product with carbon disulfide. This procedure yields PdS2 free of PdS.

Structure
PdS2 contains sulfur-sulfur bonds so it can be thought of as a disulfide that formally consists of S22− and Pd2+ ions. It adopts a layered crystal structure that contains square planar palladium centres and trigonal pyramidal sulfur centres.

Related compounds
A variety of other compounds in the Pd-S system have been reported, including Pd4S, Pd2.8S, Pd2.2S and PdS.

See also
 Pyrite
 Marcasite
 Platinum disulfide
 Platinum diselenide

References

Palladium compounds
Disulfides